Sir Frederick Richard Allen  (9 February 1920 – 28 April 2012) was a captain and coach of the All Blacks, New Zealand's national rugby union team. The All Blacks won all 14 of the test matches they played under his coaching.

Personal life
Allen was born in Oamaru, New Zealand. He was educated in Christchurch (though he did not attend secondary school), and played for the Linwood club. After captaining the Canterbury Colts in 1938, he was selected for Canterbury in 1939. During World War II Allen served as a lieutenant in the 27th and 30th Battalions in the Pacific and Italy. He played for service teams including the 2nd NZEF "Kiwis" Army team that toured Britain following the war.

Career
When he returned to New Zealand he settled in Auckland as a women's clothing manufacturer. He played for Auckland Grammar Old Boys 1946–48, and was selected for the All Blacks in 1946. In 1949 he was selected as captain of the All Blacks for the 1949 tour to South Africa. Although each test match was very close, the All Blacks lost the series 4–0. Allen retired from playing after the series.

Allen went on to coach, and was a selector-coach for Auckland during their Ranfurly Shield era of the late 1950s. He became an All Blacks selector, before becoming All Blacks coach in 1966. A fierce but very effective coach, Allen picked up the nickname of "The Needle". The All Blacks' reign under Allen was the team's most successful; they won all 14 of their tests with him as coach. The New Zealand Rugby Football Union awarded Allen the Steinlager Salver in 2002, and in 2005 Allen was inducted into the International Rugby Hall of Fame.

Honours
In the 1991 New Year Honours, Allen was appointed an Officer of the Order of the British Empire (OBE) for services to rugby. In the 2010 Queen's Birthday Honours, he was appointed a Knight Companion of the New Zealand Order of Merit (KNZM), also for services to rugby.

Following the death of Morrie McHugh on 25 September 2010, Allen had been the oldest living All Black.

Death
Allen developed leukaemia and died on 28 April 2012. He had moved into full-time care on the Whangaparaoa Peninsula, north of Auckland.

All Blacks statistics
Tests: 6 (6 as Captain)
Games: 15 (15 as Captain)
Total Matches: 21 (21 as Captain)
Test Points: 0pts
Game Points: 21pts (7t, 0c, 0p, 0dg, 0m)
Total Points: 21pts (7t, 0c, 0p, 0dg, 0m)

Notes and references
Fred the Needle: the untold story of Sir Fred Allen  the authorised biography by Alan Sayers and Les Watkins (2011. Auckland, Hodder Moa)

External links

rugbymuseum.co.nz profile
International Rugby Hall of Fame profile
"Auckland honours NZ All Black great", newzealand.com, 9 February 2010. Retrieved 12 July 2010.
Death of Fred Allen (Stuff NZ)
Sir Fred Allen photo (Stuff NZ)
Fred Allen's funeral; video (Stuff NZ)
Fred Allen visits Ypres (Stuff NZ)
Fred Allen knighted (Stuff NZ)
A Picton boy who played with Fred Allen in 1942 (Stuff NZ)

1920 births
2012 deaths
World Rugby Hall of Fame inductees
New Zealand rugby union coaches
New Zealand international rugby union players
New Zealand military personnel of World War II
Canterbury rugby union players
Auckland rugby union players
Rugby union fly-halves
Rugby union players from Oamaru
New Zealand national rugby union team coaches
Deaths from leukemia
Deaths from cancer in New Zealand
New Zealand Officers of the Order of the British Empire
Knights Companion of the New Zealand Order of Merit
Rugby players and officials awarded knighthoods
New Zealand Army officers